Middle Butte is a  summit located in Bingham County, Idaho, United States.

Description
Middle Butte is situated 40 miles east of Craters of the Moon National Monument and Preserve, 35 miles west of the community of Idaho Falls, and can be seen from Highway 20 midway between Idaho Falls and Arco at milepost 271. Middle Butte, so named because it is positioned between Big Southern Butte and line parent East Butte, were all landmarks for early explorers and pioneers. Middle Butte is set on land belonging to the Idaho National Laboratory. This landform's toponym has been officially adopted by the United States Board on Geographic Names.

Geology
Middle Butte is a cryptodome composed of basalt which formed when an underlying mass of rhyolitic magma pushed up overlying layers of basalt of the Snake River Plain, but the magma never broke the surface. This manner of formation is different than that of East Butte where rhyolitic magma did break through the surface layer of basalt.

Climate
Middle Butte is located in a cold semi-arid climate zone with warm summers and cold winters (Köppen BSk). Winter temperatures can drop below 0 °F with wind chill factors below −20 °F. Precipitation is relatively sparse.

Gallery

See also
 List of mountain peaks of Idaho

References

External links
 Middle Butte: weather forecast
 Three Buttes: Historical Marker Database

Mountains of Idaho
Landforms of Bingham County, Idaho
North American 1000 m summits
Lava domes